The 1961 Oklahoma State Cowboys football team represented Oklahoma State University–Stillwater in the Big Eight Conference during the 1961 NCAA University Division football season. In their seventh season under head coach Cliff Speegle, the Cowboys compiled a 4–6 record (2–5 against conference opponents), tied for sixth place in the conference, and were outscored by opponents by a combined total of 166 to 154.

On offense, the 1961 team averaged 15.4 points scored, 191.2 rushing yards, and 64.3 passing yards per game.  On defense, the team allowed an average of 16.6 points scored, 151.8 rushing yards, and 84.7 passing yards per game The team's statistical leaders included Jim Dillard with 627 rushing yards, Mike Miller with 371 passing yards, Don Brewington with 215 receiving yards, and Bill McFarland with 42 points scored.

No Oklahoma State players were selected as first-team All-Big Eight Conference players.

The team played its home games at Lewis Field in Stillwater, Oklahoma.

Schedule

After the season

The 1962 NFL Draft was held on December 4, 1961. The following Cowboys were selected.

References

Oklahoma State
Oklahoma State Cowboys football seasons
Oklahoma State Cowboys football